Video CD or VCD is a video medium with a lower digital resolution than DVD.

VCD may also refer to:

 VCD Athletic, football team
 Voice command device
 Value change dump, a dumpfile format
 Vocal cord dysfunction
 Vibrational circular dichroism
 Vinyl cyclohexene dioxide, also known as 4-vinylcyclohexene diepoxide
 Victoria River Downs Airport, IATA airport code "VCD"
 Verkehrsclub Deutschland, a German mobility association